The 14th series of The Bill, a British television drama, consisted of 121 episodes.

Background
The series began with the appointment of new executive producer Richard Handford, who replaced Michael Chapman after his 9-year reign came to an end in the previous series. The appointment preceded discussions with broadcaster ITV about returning to the format of hour-long episodes, which the show last used on a regular basis in 1987. The request was approved, and hour-long episodes began to air twice weekly beginning in August, a format the series retained until moving to a later time-slot in 2009. Due to the rapid transition, several of the first hour-long episodes were originally written for the half-hour time-slot, and thus, some episodes contain two completely different stories, written by different writers, which jump from one to another. For example, the opening episode, "Deep End", was initially written in three twenty-five-minute parts, with a fourth epilogue episode, the first half of "The Party's Over", all conceived by Elizabeth Anne-Wheal. A separate story by Neil Clarke, initially envisaged as an entirely separate episode, was broadcast as the second half of "The Party's Over". 

Handford also attempted to introduce a more serialized element to the programme, however individual stand-alone episodes were retained. The first major multi-part storylines came towards the autumn and aired back-to-back; Michael Higgs, who was cast as PC Eddie Santini at the beginning of the series, emerged as a villain as he attempted to rape new WPC Rosie Fox before bullying her out of Sun Hill in a four-part storyline. The plot would be revisited in another four-part storyline during the following series. The second plot saw PC Tony Stamp face trial for killing a pedestrian with the Area Car. The reception to the serialized episodes were popular, and while there weren't any other episodes of this kind that aired after these two storylines, serialized, multi-part storylines were frequently seen whilst Handford was executive producer. In addition to format changes, Handford dramatically changed the title sequence, which had been the same barring minor updates since the first series, with the theme song tweaked and the scene of the Area Car driving at the camera and images of the cast replaced by various scenes involving police work including vehicles, interviews and prisoner processing.

Among the 6 character exits, the most high-profile was that of Kevin Lloyd as DC Tosh Lines. Lloyd, who appeared in approximately 454 episodes over a 10-year period, was sensationally dismissed from the show for alcoholism, and Lloyd tragically died on 2 May after an unsuccessful stint in rehab. His final episode came on 9 June, more than a month after his passing. DS Alistair Greig & WPC Norika Datta departed after 9 years each on the show, along with WDC Suzi Croft & PC Mike Jarvis (5 years apiece) and WPC Debbie Keane (3 years). Among those to join the cast were George Rossi, who took on the role of DC Duncan Lennox after a guest appearance in the previous series, while Samantha Robson was cast as WPC Vicky Hagen, the show's first female Area Car driver. The biggest arrival was that of now-DCI Frank Burnside, who appeared in a two-part special that included scenes filmed in Manchester, as Christopher Ellison returned to the role five years after leaving Sun Hill as a DI.

Cast changes

Arrivals
 PC Eddie Santini - (Episode 12-)
 WPC Vicky Hagen (Episode 51-)
 WPC Rosie Fox (Episode 89-92)
 WDC Kerry Holmes (Episode 98-)
 DC Duncan Lennox (Episode 109-)

Departures
 WDC Suzi Croft - Accepts a transfer to High Barnet
 PC Mike Jarvis - Accepts a transfer to the Diplomatic Protection Group
 DC Tosh Lines - Presumably moves to the Coroners Office (although to the untimely death of actor Kevin Lloyd, the manner of his exit is up for debate) 
 WPC Norika Datta - Accepts a transfer to the Crime Police Unit
 DS Alistair Greig - Transfers away due to his appeal against Tenure being rejected
 WPC Rosie Fox - Requests transfer after attempted rape and bullying campaign by Eddie Santini (temporary departure)
 WPC Debbie Keane - unexplained

Episodes
{| class="wikitable plainrowheaders" style="width:100%; margin:auto; background:#FFFFFF;"
|-style="color:#048"
! style="background-color:#66BBFF;" width="20"|#
! style="background-color:#66BBFF;" width="150"|Title
! style="background-color:#66BBFF;" width="280"|Episode notes
! style="background-color:#66BBFF;" width="140"|Directed by
! style="background-color:#66BBFF;" width="170"|Written by
! style="background-color:#66BBFF;" width="30"|Original air date

|}

1998 British television seasons
The Bill series